This was the first edition of the women's event.

Anna-Lena Friedsam and Monica Niculescu won the title, defeating Angelina Gabueva and Anastasia Zakharova in the final, 6–2, 4–6, [10–5].

Seeds

Draw

Draw

References
Main Draw

Astana Open - Doubles